Pat Sperduto (born October 14, 1966) is an American football coach and executive. He is currently the Director of College Scouting for the Kansas City Chiefs of the National Football League. Sperduto played his entire three-year Arena career as an active player with Tampa Bay Storm, and was also the final head coach of the Nashville Kats.

College career
Sperduto attended the UMass Boston. While there, he was both a fullback and linebacker. He earned All-New England Conference honors from 1987-1989.

Professional playing career
Sperduto was an Offensive lineman / Defensive lineman for the Tampa Bay Storm from  until . While playing for Tampa Bay, he won two ArenaBowls. For his career, he recorded 24 tackles, three sacks, two forced fumbles and two fumble recoveries.

Professional coaching career

Early career
While playing for the Storm, Sperduto also served as a coach at Murray State University, along with National Football League General Manager Scott Pioli. Then, in 1992, Sperduto took over football operations for the American Sports Foundation of Macelatta in Tolentino, Italy.

Arena Football League (1995–2001)
The next season, he served as defensive coordinator for the Connecticut Coyotes.

Then in  the team finished 9-5 and earned a spot in ArenaBowl XIV. In , the Kats finished 10-4, won the National Conference Southern Division, and punched their ticket to ArenaBowl XV, losing for a second time in a row in the AFL World Championship Game.

After the season, the franchise was sold to Virgil Williams, an Atlanta businessman, who purchased the franchise for nearly $10 million in December 2001, where he moved them to Georgia, to become the Georgia Force.

National Football League
Sperduto was hired by the Tennessee Titans in September 2001, and served on the coaching and scouting staffs until June 2008.

Arena Football League (2005–2008)
In , Sperduto returned to coaching in the Arena Football League as Head coach and Director of football operations for the "new" Nashville Kats franchise. That season, the Kats went 6-9-1 and finished third in the Central Division. The next season the team went 8-8 en route to a second-place finish in the division and spot in the playoffs. The  season saw Nashville go 7-9 and miss the playoffs by one game. After the season, the team folded, once again.

On June 15, 2008, he was hired as the fourth head coach of the Columbus Destroyers. However, the 2009 AFL season was cancelled due to economic concerns regarding the league.

National Football League (2009–present)
On May 1, 2009, Sperduto was hired by his friend, Pioli, as a scout for the Kansas City Chiefs. He is currently the Director of College Scouting.

Broadcasting
Sperduto has also done some broadcasting work, acting as a color analyst for high school and college football games on local Middle Tennessee television, as well as the Tennessee Titans.

Famous quotes
 "Get theirs.  Protect yours.  Put W's on the board."

Personal life
Sperduto and his wife, Laura, reside in Brentwood, Tennessee, with their son Cosmo, and daughters Roseann and Sofia.

References

External links
 UMass Boston profile
 Pat Sperduto coaching record at ArenaFan
 Pat Sperduto player stats at ArenaFan

1966 births
Living people
American football defensive linemen
American football offensive linemen
BC Lions players
Columbus Destroyers coaches
Kansas City Chiefs scouts
Murray State Racers football coaches
Tampa Bay Storm coaches
Tampa Bay Storm players
Tennessee Titans scouts
UMass–Boston Beacons football players
Sportspeople from Memphis, Tennessee
Nashville Kats coaches
Connecticut Coyotes coaches
Players of American football from Massachusetts
Players of American football from Memphis, Tennessee
Players of Canadian football from Memphis, Tennessee